My Forsaken Star or My Star in What Sky are English names used to refer to the Korean-language autobiography of Annie Park. The book's English subtitle was "Question Forever".

Park, the Eurasian daughter of a South Korean prostitute and an American soldier stationed in South Korea, found out about her mother's occupation one night at age six by following her to work; as Park returned home that same night, she was lured into an alley and sexually assaulted by a stranger. Park herself began working as a prostitute at age 16. She and a ghostwriter authored and published her book in South Korea three years later. The book became a best-seller, and was serialised in newspapers at the time; a movie based on the book began filming in late November 1965. The movie version was the debut performance of Yi Yeong-ok; Yi would go on to act in a number of other movies, such as the 1972 Janghwa Hongryeonjeon.

There were also plans to create a South Korean television series based on My Forsaken Star, as well as a U.S. version of the book. Kodansha published a Japanese translation by Naoki Matsumoto in 1966 under the title Waga Hoshiha Izukoni: Aoimeno Kankoku Joseino Shugi ("Where Will My Star Go: Diary of a Blue-Eyed Korean Girl").

References

External links
Table of contents, from the database of the National Library of Korea

1965 non-fiction books
Prostitution in South Korea
South Korean books
Autobiographies
Korean non-fiction books